A local government financing vehicle (LGFV) is a funding mechanism by a local government in China. It usually exists in the form of an investment company that sells bonds in the bond markets to finance real estate development and other local infrastructure projects. In 2019, LGFV bonds constituted 39% of total outstanding corporate bonds in China's domestic (onshore) bond market, with widely varying credit risks.

The bonds that LGFVs sell are known as "municipal investment bonds" or "municipal corporate bonds" ( or ), which are repackaged as "wealth management products" and sold to individuals.

Since local governments in China are not allowed to directly participate in the municipal bond market, LGFVs have played a unique role in securing funding for local governments to develop their economies. Both the number and the indebtedness of LGFVs have soared in recent years, sparking fears about their inability to repay debts as well as subsequent defaults.

References

Local government in China
Banking in China
Real estate in China
Government-owned companies of China
Economy of China
Bond market